Randy Baruh Samson (born 19 June 1995) is a Malaysian professional footballer who plays as a defender.

Honour
Sabah
Malaysia Premier League: 2019

References

External links

1995 births
Living people
Malaysian footballers
People from Sabah
Sabah F.C. (Malaysia) players
Perak F.C. players
Association football defenders